A list of historical, traditional, local, and recent names for districts and neighborhoods in Hudson County, New Jersey includes:

Arlington
Babbitt
Beacon
Bergen Hill
Bergen Neck
Bergen Point
Bergen Square
Bergen-Lafayette
Bergenline
Bergenwood
Boulevard East
Boyle Plaza
Bulls Ferry
Castle Point
Caven Point
Claremont
Communipaw
Constable Hook
County Avenue
Country Village
Croxton
Curries Woods
East Newark
Elysian Fields
Exchange Place
Five Corners
Downtown Jersey City
Droyer's Point 
Greenville
Guttenberg
Hackensack Riverfront
Hamilton Park 
Harmon Cove
Harmon Meadows 
Harsimus
Horseshoe
Hudson Heights
Jersey City Heights
Journal Square
Kearny Uplands
Kings Bluff
Liberty State Park
Lincoln Park/West Bergen
Marion Section
McGinley Square
Meadowview
MOTBY
New Durham
Newport
North End
North Hudson
Nungessers
Pamrapo
Paulus Hook
Pavonia
Port Jersey
Port Liberte 
Powerhouse
Racetrack
Riverbend
Schuetzen Park
Secaucus Plaza
The Shades
South Kearny
Snake Hill
Transfer Station
Union Hill
Van Vorst Park
WALDO
Weehawken Heights
West Hudson
West Side, Jersey City
Western Slope
Woodcliff

See also
Historic townships of Hudson County, New Jersey
National Register of Historic Places listings in Hudson County, New Jersey
Historic Districts in Hudson County

Geography of Hudson County, New Jersey
Neighborhoods in Hudson County, New Jersey